Plenty is a suburb in Melbourne, Victoria, Australia,  north-east of Melbourne's Central Business District, located within the Shire of Nillumbik local government area. Plenty recorded a population of 2,575 at the 2021 census.

Plenty is located within Greater Melbourne, beyond the Melbourne metropolitan area Urban Growth Boundary. It is a semi-rural area consisting mostly of large lots, with many being several acres in size. However, increasing urbanisation is evident near the border with the suburb of Greensborough. New housing estates are being established with the population in the area set to increase, however large areas of Plenty are still relatively untouched with development limited due to being in the green wedge.

History

Plenty Post Office opened on 3 August 1923 and closed in 1979. An earlier office opened in 1853 and was replaced by Whittlesea in 1864.

Plenty Primary School on Howell Road was closed in the 1990s under the Kennett Government.

Plenty Cricket Club was formed in 1946 and continues to play today.

The Plenty Historical Society was formed in 2001.

Main features and attractions

The main features of Plenty include the Greensborough Hockey Club and the Plenty War Memorial Park sports facilities, which is home to the Diamond Creek Women's Football Club at 21 Memorial Drive. DCWFC is a female-only Australia Rules club, with players ranging from 7 to 70 years old.

The Plenty River makes up the border between Mill Park and Plenty. "Blue Lake" is located in Yellow Gum Recreation Area  named for the beautiful colours of the water owing to the mineral contents. Yellow Gum Recreation Area is located in the Plenty Gorge Parklands and offers many natural and cultural experiences. A bushfire in Plenty Gorge Park occurred on 30 December 2019 and burnt approximately 65 hectares, the affected areas have now reopened. The area know known as Plenty Gorge Park has been seasonally visited by the Wurundjeri people for tens of thousands of years.

The Plenty Views Golf Park is also located on Yan Yean Rd.

Plenty Fire Station, a general store, and Plenty Hall are also within Plenty's boundaries.

Transport
The main arterial running through Plenty is Yan Yean Road. Increased pressure is being placed on this road as it is used primarily by commuters travelling between the City and new estates in Doreen and surrounds, including Laurimar. Severe congestion is experienced during peak hours and it is often difficult to enter Plenty from Memorial Drive and River Avenue heading towards the City (traditional access routes). Throughout 2018 and 2019, Yan Yean Road was upgraded from a single lane rural road into a two lane divided Arterial Road, with traffic lights installed at Memorial Drive, River Avenue and Browns Lane. This has greatly improved access for local residents of Plenty and improving congestion on Yan Yean Road.

Three metropolitan bus routes run along Yan Yean Rd. Since October 2010 SmartBus route 901 links Plenty with Melbourne Airport (T4), Broadmeadows, Epping, South Morang (Plenty Valley), Greensborough, Ringwood and Frankston. It runs via Yan Yean Road, stopping at the Plenty Store/Plenty Fire Station every 15 minutes, much increasing the public transport connections in this area.

The nearest train stations are Diamond Creek or Greensborough, on the Hurstbridge line, and South Morang, on the Mernda line.

Sport

Plenty War Memorial Park is the main sports ground in Plenty. It is home to the Plenty Cricket Club, who play in the Diamond Valley Cricket Association. Plenty Park is also used for Australian Rules Football during winter by the Diamond Creek Women's Football Club as their training and playing venue. Plenty Tennis Club play their home games at the Tennis courts at Plenty Park. Greensborough Hockey Club play their home games, senior and junior, at the Hockey Field at Plenty Park. Plenty Knights Basketball Club, who play in the Diamond Valley Basketball Association domestic competition, are based in Plenty.

See also
 Shire of Diamond Valley – Plenty was previously within this former local government area.

References

External links

Towns in Victoria (Australia)
Shire of Nillumbik